A short takeoff and landing (STOL) aircraft is a conventional fixed-wing aircraft that has short runway requirements for takeoff and landing. Many STOL-designed aircraft also feature various arrangements for use on airstrips with harsh conditions (such as high altitude or ice).  STOL aircraft, including those used in scheduled passenger airline operations, have also been operated from STOLport airfields which feature short runways.

Design considerations

Many fixed-wing STOL aircraft are bush planes, though some, like the de Havilland Canada Dash-7, are designed for use on prepared airstrips; likewise, many STOL aircraft are taildraggers, though there are exceptions like the PAC P-750 XSTOL, the Quest Kodiak, the de Havilland Canada DHC-6 Twin Otter and the Peterson 260SE. Autogyros also have STOL capability, needing a short ground roll to get airborne, but capable of a near-zero ground roll when landing.

Runway length requirement is a function of the square of the minimum flying speed (stall speed), and most design effort is spent on reducing this number. For takeoff, large power/weight ratios and low drag help the plane to accelerate for flight. The landing run is minimized by strong brakes, low landing speed, thrust reversers or spoilers (less common). Overall STOL performance is set by the length of runway needed to land or take off, whichever is longer.

Of equal importance to short ground run is the ability to clear obstacles, such as hills, on both take off and landing. For takeoff, large power/weight ratios and low drag result in a high rate of climb required to clear obstacles. For landing, high drag allows the aeroplane to descend steeply to the runway without building excess speed resulting in a longer ground run. Drag is increased by use of flaps (devices on the wings) and by a forward slip (causing the aeroplane to fly somewhat sideways through the air to increase drag).

Normally, a STOL aircraft will have a large wing for its weight. These wings often use aerodynamic devices like flaps, slots, slats, and vortex generators. Typically, designing an aircraft for excellent STOL performance reduces maximum speed, but does not reduce payload lifting ability. The payload is critical, because many small, isolated communities rely on STOL aircraft as their only transportation link to the outside world for passengers or cargo; examples include many communities in the Canadian north and Alaska.

Most STOL aircraft can land either on- or off-airport. Typical off-airport landing areas include snow or ice (using skis), fields or gravel riverbanks (often using special fat, low-pressure tundra tires), and water (using floats): these areas are often extremely short and obstructed by tall trees or hills. Wheel skis and amphibious floats combine wheels with skis or floats, allowing the choice of landing on snow/water or a prepared runway.

Kits

A number of aircraft modification companies offer STOL kits for improving short-field performance.

Crosswinds STOL of Wasilla, Alaska, sells STOL kits for light aircraft, including leading edge cuffs, tip spill plates, inboard flap extensions and STOL fences. The company offers kits for Piper PA-12, PA-14, PA-18, PA-20 and 22, Bellanca Champion Model 7 series, Cessna 170B, 180 and 185.
Horton, Inc, of Wellington, Kansas, offers STOL kits under the brand name Horton STOL-Craft, emphasizing that the modifications increase safety by allowing forced landings to occur at lower speeds and thus improve survivability. The Horton modifications include a drooped leading edge cuff, conical cambered wingtips, control surface gap seals and wing fences. The company says: "On an average you can expect to get a 4-7 knot reduction in stall speeds. Flying at these lower stall speeds you can reduce the take-off and landing distances by 10%". Horton STOL kits are available for several Cessna and Piper PA-28 models.
Micro AeroDynamics markets vortex generator modification kits for "STOL benefits". The Micro kits are small vortex generators that are glued to the wing leading edge, as well as the underside of the elevator and on the fin. Kits are available for a large number of light aircraft types.
Sierra Industries sells Robertson STOL kits, marketed under the name R/STOL, incorporate a drooped leading edge cuff, wing fences, drooping ailerons and an automatic trim system. The company says that installation "allows 15 to 25 MPH slower approaches and requires up to 40% less runway distance". R/STOL kits are available for various Cessna models.
Stolairus Aviation of Kelowna, British Columbia, has developed STOL Kits for the de Havilland Canada DHC-2 Beaver and de Havilland Canada DHC-3 Otter to increase lift and reduce stall speeds. The DHC-2 Beaver STOL Kit includes a contoured leading edge, flap-gap seals, wing fences and drooped wingtips. The DHC-3 Otter STOL Kit includes a contoured leading edge and drooped wingtips.

STOLport

A STOLport is an airport designed with STOL operations in mind, normally having a short single runway.

STOLports are not common but can be found, for example, at London City Airport in London, United Kingdom. There were also several STOLports in the United States that were used for scheduled passenger airline operations but are now no longer in existence.

CESTOL
Cruise-efficient short takeoff and landing (CESTOL), is an aircraft with both very short runway requirements and high cruise speeds (greater than Mach 0.8).

Definitions
Many different definitions of STOL have been used by different authorities and nations at various times and for a myriad of regulatory and military purposes. Some accepted definitions of STOL include:

 

Additionally, some aircraft manufacturers market their products as STOL without providing evidence that the aircraft meets any accepted definition.

See also
List of STOL aircraft
ESTOLAS
VTOL

References

External links

 
 Anatomy of a STOL Aircraft: Designing a Modern Short Take-Off and Landing Aircraft by Chris Heintz

 
Types of take-off and landing